Henry Ronald Kingham (19 November 1904 – after 1936) was an English footballer best known as a player for Luton Town.

Career

Born in Harpenden, Kingham joined his local side Luton Town from St Albans City in 1926. After playing 275 matches for Luton, Kingham left in 1937 to join Yeovil & Petters United. After Yeovil, Kingham had a spell with Worcester City before ending his career.

References

1904 births
English footballers
English Football League players
St Albans City F.C. players
Luton Town F.C. players
Yeovil Town F.C. players
People from Harpenden
Year of death missing
Worcester City F.C. players
Association football defenders